The 1984 U.S. Pro Indoor was a men's tennis tournament played on indoor carpet courts that was part of the 1984 Volvo Grand Prix. It was played at the Spectrum in Philadelphia, Pennsylvania in the United States and took place from January 23 through January 29, 1984. Second-seeded John McEnroe won his third consecutive singles title at the event.

Finals

Singles

 John McEnroe defeated  Ivan Lendl 6–3, 3–6, 6–3, 7–6(7–3)
 It was McEnroe's 1st singles title of the year and the 47th of his career.

Doubles

 Peter Fleming /  John McEnroe defeated  Henri Leconte /  Yannick Noah 
 It was Fleming's 2nd title of the year and the 49th of his career. It was McEnroe's 1st title of the year and the 93rd of his career.

See also
 Lendl–McEnroe rivalry

References

External links
 ITF tournament edition details

U.S. Pro Indoor
U.S. Pro Indoor
U.S. Professional Indoor
U.S. Professional Indoor
U.S. Professional Indoor